Waldfriedhof Zehlendorf (Zehlendorf forest cemetery) is a cemetery located in Berlin's Nikolassee district. The cemetery occupies an area of 376,975 m2. An additional Italian war cemetery was created there in 1953. A number of notable people of Berlin are buried at the cemetery; some have a grave of honor. In particular, all of Berlin's deceased post-war mayors are buried here.

Landscape and buildings 

The northern part of the cemetery was built between 1945 and 1947 by Herta Hammerbacher, and expanded from 1948 to 1954 by Max Dietrich. About a third of the area was forest, which was already 50 years old and was intentionally kept. The trees are mostly firs, with a few oaks, mountain-ashes and birches. Two straight paths in north–south direction structure the cemetery, connected by curved paths. The funeral halls are situated on a natural hill. Between the entrance and the halls is a large U-shaped meadow which was originally designed as heath. The graves are arranged in rows, both in the meadow part as in the forest part.

A war cemetery was created in 1953 for 1,183 Italian POWs, many of them unidentified, who died or were killed near Berlin. It is lined by trees and bushes and thus separated from the rest of the cemetery. The grave plates are arranged in a regular pattern.

A larger and a smaller hall are connected by smaller administrative buildings. In front of the halls, two high walls covered with travertine symbolize the transition from life to death. The halls are reinforced concrete structures, with fronts of glass open to nature. Architect Ruegenberg, a student of Hans Scharoun, built simple rectangular elements on the walls and ceiling, based on a square module, and achieved "zurückhaltende Feierlichkeit" (reticent solemnity). An entrance gate at the Potsdamer Chaussee was built in 1950 by Friedrich Dückerstieg, and a gate at Wasgensteig in 1959 by Hans-Joachim Sachse and Bernhard Busen. A bell tower on the meadow was created in 1973 by Ruegenberg and Möllendorff.

Notable people 

Many Berlin celebrities are buried on the Waldfriedhof Zehlendorf. 43 (as of 2002) have an Ehrengrab, cared for by the Berlin Senate (marked by * in the following list), including Willy Brandt, Mayor of Berlin and Bundeskanzler, and ballet dancer and choreographer Tatjana Gsovsky.
 Hans Beirer (1911–1993), Kammersänger
 Gerhard Bienert (1898–1986), actor
 Günther Birkenfeld (1901–1966), writer
 Boris Blacher* (1903–1975), composer
 Peter Bloch (1900–1984), politician
 Peter Bloch Jr. (1925–1994), art historian and academic teacher
 Jan Bontjes van Beek (1899–1969), ceramic artist
 Rut Brandt (1920–2006), author, married to Willy Brandt
 Willy Brandt* (1913–1992), politician, Mayor of Berlin, Bundeskanzler
 Herwig Friedag (1921–2012), journalist
 Fritz Eberhard (1896–1982), publicist, politician
 Hendrikje Fitz (1961–2016), actress
 Peter Fitz (1931–2013), stage and film actor
 Götz Friedrich (1930–2000), opera and theatre director.
 Ekkehard Fritsch (1922–1987), actor
 Ernst Fritsch (1892–1965), painter
 Fritz Genschow (1905–1977), actor
 Tatjana Gsovsky* (1901–1993), ballet dancer
 Ina Halley (1927–1992), actress
 Edith Hancke (1928–2015), stage, film and television actress
 Otfrid von Hanstein (1869–1959), actor and writer
 Paula von Hanstein (1883–1966), writer
 Karl Hartung (1908–1967), sculptor
 Hermann Henselmann (1905–1995), architect
 Karl-Josef Hering (1929–1998) Kammersänger and actor
 Martin Held* (1908–1992), actor
 Martin Hirthe (1921–1981), actor
 Wolfgang Holst (1922–2010), president of Hertha BSC
 Helmut Käutner* (1908–1980), stage director
 Jakob Kaiser* (1888–1961), Federal Minister
 Gustav Klingelhöfer* (1888–1961), politician
 Hildegard Knef* (1925–2002), actress
 Hermine Körner (1878–1960), actress
 Gerhard Lamprecht (1897–1974), director and screenwriter
 Léo Lania (1896–1961), journalist, playwright and screenwriter
 Annedore Leber* (1904–1968), publicist
 Julius Leber* (1891–1945), resistance fighter
 Ernst Lemmer* (1898–1970), Federal Minister
 Eva Lissa (1913–1988), actress
 Paul Löbe* (1875–1967), President of the Reichstag
 Heinrich Lummer (1932–2019), politician
 Gerd Martienzen* (1918–1988), actor
 Christiane Maybach (1932–2006), film and television actress
 Klaus Miedel (1915–2000), actor
 Wolfgang Menge (1924–2012), writer and journalist
 Wolfgang Müller (1922–1960), actor
 Wolfgang Neuss (1923–1989), actor
 Maria Ney (1890–1961), cabaret performer
 Bruno Paul* (1874–1968), architect
 Günter Pfitzmann (1924–2003), actor
 Erwin Piscator* (1893–1966), stage director
 Gerhart Pohl* (1902–1966), writer
 Ernst Reuter* (1889–1953), Mayor of Berlin
 Ernst Ruska (1906–1988), engineer
 Helmut Ruska (1908–1973), physician
 Ulrich Schamoni (1939–1998), stage director
 Hans Scharoun* (1893–1972), architect
 Clemens Schmalstich (1880–1960), composer and conductor
 Wolfdietrich Schnurre* (1920–1989), writer and illustrator
 Bubi Scholz (1930–2000), boxer (moved to Friedhof Heerstraße)
 Richard Schubert* (1877–1955), resistance fighter
 Karl Schuke (1906–1987), organ builder
 Klaus Schütz* (1926–2012), politician, Mayor of Berlin
 Peter Seum (1949–1998) actor
 Ruth Stephan (1925–1975), actress
 Heinz Striek (1918–2011), politician
 Otto Suhr* (1894–1957), politician, Mayor of Berlin
 Heinz Trökes (1913–1997), painter
 Wilhelm Weise (1936–2012), physician, director of the Robert Koch-Institut
 Wolfgang Zeller (1893–1967), composer

Literature 
 Klaus Hammer: Historische Friedhöfe & Grabmäler in Berlin. Stattbuch, Berlin 1994
 Klaus Konrad Weber, Peter Güttler, Ditta Ahmadi (Hrsg.): Berlin und seine Bauten. Teil X Band A: Anlagen und Bauten für die Versorgung (3) Bestattungswesen. Wilhelm Ernst & Sohn, Berlin 1981, 
 Hans-Jürgen Mende: Lexikon Berliner Grabstätten. Haude & Spener, Berlin 2006.

References

External links 

 Waldfriedhof Zehlendorf project Historische Friedhöfe in Berlin 
 Sergius Ruegenberg Architekt und Autor (*1903 †1996) Internationale Architektur-Datenbank 
 Waldfriedhof Zehlendorf map
 Kapelle Waldfriedhof Zehlendorf
 Waldfriedhof Berlin-Zehlendorf and the Italian War Cemetery images

Cemeteries in Berlin